Anna Karolina Orzelska (23 November 1707 – 27 September 1769) was a Polish szlachcianka (noblewoman) and an adventuress. Born as an illegitimate daughter of August II the Strong, Elector of Saxony and King of Poland, by Henriette Rénard she became Hereditary Duchess of Schleswig-Holstein-Sonderburg-Beck by marriage.

Life
The King-Elector August II the Strong met Henriette Rénard in  Warsaw in 1706, where her father André Rénard, a wine merchant from Lyon, had a salon. Most historians agree that at first, Henriette didn't know the true identity of her lover. As a result of the liaison, in November 1707 a daughter was born, Anna Karolina. August did not learn of her existence until a year and half later. Henriette married the Paris businessman François Drian shortly after Anna Karolina's birth and moved to France, where she grew up.

For a long time, the girl lived in Paris with her mother in complete obscurity without the support of her father. However, in 1723, her half-brother, the later Count Frederick Augustus Rutowsky, found her. Anna Karolina followed him on his return to the Dresden court, where the sixteen-year-old beauty was presented to the King. On 19 September 1724, August the Strong officially acknowledged Anna Karolina as his daughter and gave her the title of Countess Orzelska (Polish: Hrabina Orzelska, German: Gräfin Orzelska).

The first time that she appears in a document was on 21 November 1726 during the Diet of Grodno, at which the King personally signed the donation of the Blue Palace to her, which became Anna Karolina's official residence.

Anna Karolina became one of Augustus's most beloved children, not only because of her exceptional beauty, but also because of her improbable and extraordinary resemblance to her father. Without formal intellectual training, she nevertheless proved to be an excellent addition in the court life.

The court of August the Strong had the worst reputation in Europe and encouraged the Countess's behavior, which was considered scandalous according to the official moral of the time. Contemporaries noted her tendency to drink, smoke tobacco, and have numerous affairs. Anna excelled in riding, hunting, and dancing. The Countess frequently appeared in men's clothing and even in military uniform. Some sources alleged that August the Strong made his own daughter his favorite; however, this cannot be proved.

In 1728, while King Frederick Wilhelm I of Prussia was visiting Dresden, the Countess Orzelska met his son, the Crown Prince Frederick (the future Frederick II the Great).  She became the first (and, probably, the only) mistress of Frederick's life. In early 1729, Orzelska secretly arrived in Berlin in order to spend time with the Prussian heir. He dedicated verses and musical works of his own composition to her. Some believe that Orzelska, during her liaison with Frederick, attempted to gather intelligence on him and Prussia.

In 1730, the Countess obtained from her father 300,000 thalers as a dowry and married with Prince Charles Louis of Schleswig-Holstein-Sonderburg-Beck - younger brother of the reigning Duke Frederick Wilhelm II- in the city of Dresden, on 10 August of that year. They had one son, Karl Frederick (b. Dresden, 5 January 1732 - d. Strassburg, 21 February 1772), future General Major of the Saxon Army. Her husband would become Duke after their divorce.

However, after three years of unhappy marriage (1733), Orzelska requested a divorce; from this moment, the couple began to live separately: Karl Ludwig in Königsberg and Anna Karolina in Venice, where she had a scandalous lifestyle.

She died in the French city of Grenoble aged 61, and was buried in the Church of Saint-Louis, in the Chapel of Saint-Jean-Baptiste.

See also
 Saxon Garden
 Elżbieta Sieniawska

References

1707 births
1769 deaths
Nobility from Warsaw
Mistresses of German royalty
Anna Karolina
Illegitimate children of Augustus the Strong
18th-century Polish women
Albertine branch
18th-century Polish nobility
Daughters of kings